Abby Hatcher (originally titled Abby Hatcher, Fuzzly Catcher) is a Canadian CGI-animated television series created by Rob Hoegee. Produced by Guru Studio in conjunction with Spin Master Entertainment, the series premiered on Nickelodeon in the United States on January 1, 2019, TVOKids in Canada on February 11, 2019, and on Channel 5's Milkshake! block on March 2, 2020 in the United Kingdom. It premiered online on December 18, 2018.

On June 4, 2019, the series was renewed for a second season. New episodes moved to the Nick Jr. Channel, where they have been shown since November 10, 2019. The final episode of the series aired on April 2, 2022.

Premise
The series follows an intelligent and energetic seven-year-old girl named Abby Hatcher, and her new friends, the Fuzzlies. The Fuzzlies are quirky creatures that live in her family's hotel. Together with her best Fuzzly friend Bozzly, Abby goes on wild adventures to fix Fuzzly mishaps and help them in any way she can.

Episodes

Characters

Main
 Abby Hatcher (voiced by Macy Drouin in the North America, and Maisie Marsh in the UK) is a bespectacled seven-year-old girl of mixed Canadian and Chinese descent who possesses detective skills. She is equipped with a wrist device called the Fuzzly Spotter which notifies her of a trouble involving a Fuzzly, plus it can operate different things in the hotel.
 Bozzly (voiced by Wyatt White) is an aquamarine rabbit-like Fuzzly who can turn invisible, and fly (by spinning his ears like a propeller). He also has super sensitive hearing, and has a front pocket containing various objects (some of which are larger than him). He is Abby's best friend and partner.

Fuzzlies
 Princess Flug (voiced by Michela Luci) is a pink slug-like Fuzzly who is made of glitter goo which can either be sticky or slippery. She can blow bubbles that could carry away anything that gets inside them, or neutralize sticky glitter gloo.
 Teeny Terry (voiced by Jacob Soley) is a small round marigold cat-bird-like Fuzzly with winged arms that allow him to fly. He can inflate like a balloon which enables him to fly higher and carry more load.
 Otis (voiced by Christian Dal Dosso) is a red raspberry-like Fuzzly with three extendable tentacles on his head which can be used for swinging or reaching things several feet away. His tentacles also have holes that open which can stick to objects or pump air to inflatables.
 Curly (voiced by Sophie Cullingan) is a pink and orange rabbit-like Fuzzly with a spiral tail that can work like a spring, thus allowing her to leap high (and to also hold things as she lacks arms). She often says a word three times.
 Mo (voiced by Laaibah Alvi) and Bo (voiced by Leo Orgil, respectively) are twin cat-like Fuzzlies with stretchy torsos that allow them to reach things several feet high, and to slingshot stuff. They also have retractable heads and limbs, the ability to grow multiple extra pairs of legs in the middle, and heads that light up. Mo is a white female while Bo is a black male.
 Harriet Bouffant (voiced by Hattie Kragten) is a ragdoll-like Fuzzly with extendable pink and yellow hair which can be used as extra limbs. When her extended hair gets long enough, it can detach, leaving only a normal size portion on her head.
 The Squeaky Peepers (all voiced by Kate Miller) are an octet of small, helium-voiced, rainbow-coloured singing rabbit-like Fuzzlies. Their names are in this order: Big Do (the violet peeper), Re (red), Mi (orange), Fa (yellow with glasses), So (green), La (blue), Ti (indigo), and Little Do (small and pink, sometimes with a blue pacifier in her mouth).
 Flugtilda (voiced by Holly Gorski) is an orange slug-like Fuzzly with green eyes who wears glasses and a baseball cap who is the cousin of Princess Flug. She neither possesses powers nor does she have a symbol that would represent her.
 Grumbles (voiced by Kaden Stephen) is a large purple meerkat-like Fuzzly who has the power to transform into anything. Abby met him in the wilderness, and thought he was some folklore creature.
 Mumbles (voiced by Ian Ho) is a small dark blue meerkat-like Fuzzly who is one of Grumbles' younger cousins. There are rules on how to raise him, and doing any rule wrong would cause him to multiply.
 The Blossom Band are a quartet of plant-like Fuzzlies who like playing music. Their names are Tulip (voiced by Gracen Daly), Rose (voiced by Molly Lewis), Sweet Pea (voiced by Beatrice Schneider), and Daisy (voiced by Jackson Reid). Tulip, Rose, and Sweet Pea are female, while Daisy is male. Tulip plays a saxophone, Rose plays an electric guitar, Sweet Pea plays maracas, and Daisy plays a keytar.

Humans
 Chef Jeff (voiced by Paul Sun-Hyung Lee) is the diminutive chef of Abby's hotel. Chef Jeff is also the subject of a running gag where Abby, in her tricycle, passes by the kitchen where he is working on a dish, therefore resulting a comical accident, but he would nonetheless enjoy or find something positive about it. Besides a chef, he is also a tuba player. He has a mother who is a chef too.
 Miranda Hatcher (voiced by Josette Jorge) is Abby's Chinese mother who works as the hotel gardener.
 Lex Hatcher (voiced by Terry McGurrin) is Abby's Canadian father who works at the front desk, and fixes things in the hotel when they break.
 Melvin (voiced by Christian Campbell in North America and Eden Lawrence in the UK) is Mrs. Melvin's four-year-old son who is an animal fanatic. He owns a pet cat named Elvin.
 Mrs. Melvin (voiced by Kim Roberts) is the hotel salon's hairstylist.
 Mr. Melvin (voiced by Mac Heywood) is Mrs. Melvin's husband and Melvin's father.
 Judge Thorn (voiced by Catherine Disher) is a local judge of contests and events. Judge Thorn has a slight resemblance to Carol Burnett. She is also a TV personality.
 Wai Po (voiced by Jane Luk) is Abby's grandmother from China. Despite her age, she is quite athletic.
 Allen and Jeffrey are two men who are seen wandering around outside.

Animals
 Elvin (voiced by Shayle Simons) is Melvin's pet cat.
 Sparkles is Princess Flug's pet slug.
 Portia is Chef Jeff's pet fish.

Broadcast
Abby Hatcher made its Canadian debut on educational provincial broadcasters TVOKids and Knowledge Network on February 11, 2019. The show premiered on Nick Jr. in the United Kingdom on May 6, 2019, and on Channel 5's Milkshake! block on March 2, 2020. The series is currently available on Paramount+ and Netflix.

Ratings
 

| link2             = List of Abby Hatcher episodes#Season 2 (2020–22)
| episodes2         = 25
| start2            = 
| end2              = 
| startrating2      = 0.31
| endrating2        = 0.10
| viewers2          = |2}} 
}}

References

External links
 
 

2010s Canadian animated television series
2020s Canadian animated television series
2010s preschool education television series
2020s preschool education television series
2019 Canadian television series debuts
2022 Canadian television series endings
2010s Canadian children's television series
2020s Canadian children's television series
Animated preschool education television series
Canadian children's animated action television series
Canadian children's animated adventure television series
Canadian children's animated comedy television series
Canadian preschool education television series
English-language television shows
Nick Jr. original programming
TVO original programming
Animated television series about children